Beppe Menegatti (born Giuseppe Menegatti; 6 September 1929), is an Italian theatre director.

Life 
Born in Florence, Menegatti attended performances at the Maggio Musicale Fiorentino at a young boy. The Silvio D'Amico National Academy in Rome awarded him a scholarship. In the mid-1950s he was called by Luchino Visconti as assistant director. He collaborated during his career with Eduardo De Filippo and Vittorio De Sica.

He has directed operas, ballets and plays by important authors, including, in 1964, the Italian premiere of Samuel Beckett's Play and that of Isaac Babel's Maria.

He directed many of the shows of his wife, ballerina Carla Fracci, whom he married in 1964 and with whom he had a son, Francesco, born in 1969. She died on 27 May 2021.

References

External links 
 Beppe Menegatti, husband Carla Fracci italy24news.com 27 May 2021

Italian theatre directors
1929 births
Living people
People from Florence